HMS Diana was an  protected cruiser built for the Royal Navy in the mid-1890s.

Service history
She was commissioned at Chatham on 16 February 1900 by Captain Henry Baynes, to take out reliefs for HMS Ringarooma, HMS Boomerang and HMS Torch serving on the Australia Station, and left Plymouth two weeks later on 27 February 1900. Stopping in Gibraltar, Malta and Aden on her way out, she arrived in Australia in April, when Baynes took command of HMS Mildura, stationed there, and Captain Henry Leah of the latter ship took command of Diana for the return journey.

The following year, she was commissioned with the complement of 450 officers and men at Chatham on 15 January 1901 to join the Mediterranean Fleet under the command of Captain Arthur Murray Farquhar. In March 1901 she was one of two cruisers to escort HMS Ophir, commissioned as royal yacht for the world tour of the Duke and Duchess of Cornwall and York (later King George and Queen Mary), from Gibraltar to Malta, and then to Port Said. Captain Edmond Slade was appointed in command in April 1902, but Farquhar did not leave the ship until early June. In May 1902 she visited Palermo to attend festivities in connection with the opening of an Agricultural Exhibition by King Victor Emmanuel, and in August 1902 she toured the Aegean Sea, visiting Salonica and Lemnos. She was at Argostoli in early October before returning to Malta.

Footnotes

References

 

Eclipse-class cruisers
Ships built in Govan
1895 ships